Mucor hiemalis is among the zygosporic fungi found in unspoiled foods. It has different industrial importance as biotransforming agents of pharmacological and chemical compounds.

Morphology and cell structure 
Mucor hiemalis grows in expanding gray colonies. It grows branched sporangiophores that yielding yellow to dark brown sporangia which can mate to form black-brown, spiny  zygospores.

Physiology 
Mucor hiemalis is nitrate positive and requires thiamin to grow.

References

External links 
 Index Fungorum
 USDA ARS Fungal Database
 

Fungal plant pathogens and diseases
Mucoraceae
Fungi described in 1903